Netaji Subhash Mahavidyalaya, is a government degree college (Affiliated with Tripura University), situated in the Udaipur Sub-Division of the Gomati District of Tripura, India. This college was established in 1979 and recognised by the University Grants Commission in 2004.

See also
Education in India
Education in Tripura
List of institutions of higher education in Tripura

References

Colleges in Tripura